Dianji is a former town in eastern Shandong province, China, located around  northeast of Jimo, which administers it.

See also 
 List of township-level divisions of Shandong

References 

Township-level divisions of Shandong